The R156 road is a regional road in Ireland, linking Dunboyne in County Meath to the N4 (near Mullingar) in County Westmeath. The road is single carriageway throughout. Many parts of the route have dangerous bends.

Route
(East to West)
The route leaves the rapidly expanding town of Dunboyne. The remainder of the route is through rural Meath and Westmeath, passing through the villages of Mullagh, Summerhill, Rathmolyon and Ballivor in Meath and Raharney and Killucan in Westmeath before connecting to the N4 at The Downs east of Mullingar. It joins the N4 at a dangerous at-grade junction with a busy dual-carriageway.

See also
Roads in Ireland
National primary road
National secondary road

References
Roads Act 1993 (Classification of Regional Roads) Order 2006 – Department of Transport

Regional roads in the Republic of Ireland
Roads in County Meath
Roads in County Dublin
Roads in County Westmeath